Robert Randolph Ingersoll (January 8, 1883 – January 13, 1927) was a Major League Baseball pitcher for the Cincinnati Reds in 1914. He pitched in just four games that year, all in relief. In six innings of work he gave up five hits, five walks and two runs while striking out two batters.

External links

Major League Baseball pitchers
Cincinnati Reds players
Seattle Giants players
Vancouver Beavers players
Minneapolis Millers (baseball) players
Columbus Senators players
Omaha Rourkes players
Baseball players from South Dakota
1883 births
1927 deaths